The Skyline Conference men's basketball tournament is the annual conference basketball championship tournament for the NCAA Division III Skyline Conference. It is a single-elimination tournament and seeding is based on regular season records.

The winner receives the Skyline's automatic bid to the NCAA Men's Division III Basketball Championship.

Results
 Record is incomplete prior to 2004

Championship records
Results incomplete before 2004

 Schools highlighted in pink are former members of the Skyline
 SUNY Maritime, Merchant Marine, Mount Saint Vincent, and Sarah Lawrence have not yet qualified for the tournament finals
 Bard, Centenary, NYU Poly, and Stevens never qualified for the tournament finals as conference members

See also
NCAA Division III men's basketball tournament

References

NCAA Division III men's basketball conference tournaments
Basketball Tournament, Men's